The 1941–42 St. Francis Terriers men's basketball team represented St. Francis College during the 1941–42 NCAA men's basketball season. The team was coached by future Basketball Hall of Famer Joseph Brennan, who was in his first year at the helm of the St. Francis Terriers. The team was not part of a conference and played as division I independents. The Terriers played their home games at the Bulter Street Gymnasium in their Cobble Hill, Brooklyn campus.

The 1941–41 team finished with a .889 record at 16–2.

Roster

Preseason

Prior to the season starting former head coach Rody Cooney resigned. He recommended Joseph Brennan or Bob Griebe for the position. Both Joseph and Bob were former Brooklyn Visitations players. Then athletics director Brother Richard O.S.F. hired Joseph and Bob, with Joseph the head coach of the varsity team and Bob of the freshman team.

Regular season

St. Francis won its first nine games and in that span was the highest scoring team in the New York Metropolitan area, averaging 60 points per game. Against La Salle, Jim Agoglia came close to setting an individual scoring record at Madison Square Garden by scoring 20 points. The La Salle game was at Madison Square Garden and the Explorers were the favorites to win, but the Terriers won 50–34.

Their first loss of the season came against N.Y.U. at Madison Square Garden. The Terriers riding a 9-game win streak were the favorites to win but they lost a close game 37–40. The Terriers were leading 23–14 at the half.
Coming off their first loss of the season the Terriers defeated Saint Peter's, and set a record in the Metropolitan area for their 85–29 victory.
The Terriers then beat Brooklyn College and Manhattan College and were in the running for a National Invitation Tournament spot. The Terriers then lost to CCNY and were out of the running. After the CCNY loss, the Terriers defeated Hofstra and upset St. John's to finish the season at 16–2. Brooklyn sports writers were of the opinion that St. Francis should still qualify for the NIT considering the 16-2 record.

Schedule and results

|-
!colspan=12 style="background:#0038A8; border: 2px solid #CE1126;;color:#FFFFFF;"| Regular Season

|-

References

St. Francis Brooklyn Terriers men's basketball seasons
St. Francis
Saint Francis
Saint Francis